The 2012–13 season was AC Ajaccio's 95th season.

Transfers

In

Out

Current squad and statistics

|}

Friendly matches

Competitions

Ligue 2

League table

Results summary

Results by round

Matches

Coupe de France

Coupe de la Ligue

Statistics

Top scorers

References

2012–13 season
Ajaccio